"You Bring on the Sun" is a song by British-American band Londonbeat, released as the lead single from their third studio album, Harmony (1992). It was produced by Martyn Phillips and written by the four members of the band, and also received remixes by David Morales and Snowboy. Becoming a major European hit, it peaked within the Top 10 in several countries, like Austria, Belgium (number three), Denmark, Finland, Germany, the Netherlands, Norway, Portugal, Spain and Sweden. In the UK, it peaked at number 32, and on the Eurochart Hot 100, it reached number 10 in July 1992. Outside Europe, the song peaked at number 135 in Australia.

Critical reception
Stephen Thomas Erlewine from AllMusic described the song as a "enjoyable" slice of early-'90s "soulful, tuneful dance-pop". British newspaper Lennox Herald deemed it "typically catchy and commercial." A reviewer from Music & Media wrote, "As if time stood still, here is vintage Londonbeat, delivering their soulful pop with those heavenly vocals and the trademark twangy guitar in the background. This will exactly fulfil the public's demand." Sian Pattenden from Smash Hits gave it three out of five.

Music video
A music video was produced to promote the single. It was later published on Londonbeat's official YouTube channel in March 2013. The video has amassed more than 4,5 million views as of September 2021.

Track listings
 12-inch maxi, Europe (1992)
 "You Bring On the Sun" (Sunshine Samba mix) – 5:15
 "You Bring On the Sun" (7-inch) – 3:35
 "You Bring On the Sun" (Cruise Control mix) – 6:00
 "You Bring On the Sun" (Cruise Control edit) – 3:50

 CD single, UK and Europe (1992)
 "You Bring On the Sun" (7-inch) – 3:39
 "You Bring On the Sun" (Morales club) – 5:45
 "You Bring On the Sun" (Sunshine Samba mix) – 5:17
 "Dreaming of You" (Deep Sleep mix) – 5:03

 CD maxi, UK and Europe (1992)
 "You Bring On the Sun" (7-inch) – 3:39
 "You Bring On the Sun" (Sunshine Samba mix) – 5:17
 "Dreaming of You" (Deep Sleep mix) – 5:03

Charts

Weekly charts

Year-end charts

References

External links
 Londonbeat Official Website
 Facebook Page

1992 singles
1992 songs
Dance-pop songs
House music songs
Londonbeat songs